Daanbantayan, officially the Municipality of Daanbantayan,  is a 1st class municipality in the province of Cebu, Philippines. According to the 2020 census, it has a population of 93,502 people.

Located at the northern tip of Cebu island, Daanbantayan celebrates its annual fiesta along with the Haladaya Festival which starts 21 August and ends with street-dancing on 30 August, in honor of Datu Daya, the legendary founder of the town.

Daanbantayan is bordered on the north by the Visayan Sea, to the west by Bantayan Island, on the east by the Camotes Sea, and on the south by the town of Medellin.

History

The name Daanbantayan was derived from two words: the word "daan", which means "old" in Cebuano, and the word "bantayan", which refers to a place that served as a look out for Moro raiders during the Pre-Hispanic Philippines. The original site of the town might have been at an elevated vantage point near Punta, in Tapilon.

On 8 November 2013, 9 people were killed and 50 injured when Super Typhoon Haiyan (Yolanda in Philippines area of responsibility) passed over Daanbantayan.

Geography

Islands and thalassic attractions

There are several small islands/islets and diving spots, with the list below arranged by latitude from nearest to farthest from Cebu island:
 Chocolate
 Monad Shoal
 Malapascua 
 Gato cave & islet 
 Maria 
 Carnaza

Barangays

Daanbantayan comprises 20 barangays:

Climate

Demographics

Economy

Transportation
Ceres Liner (And Sugbo Transit), White Stallion Express (Subsidiary Of Rough Riders) and Cebu Autobus are among the bus companies with regular service to and from Cebu city (North Bus Terminal). Jeepneys, tricycles, and trisikads are the main modes of transportation within the town.

Tourism

Daanbantayan is now known for its pristine, white powder-like sandy beaches – one of which is Malapascua Island. With its vast and rich marine resources, it hosts a long string of dive sites offering unique marine life and beauty.

As a tourist destination, Daanbantayan stages the Haladaya Festival every year as an added attraction to local vacationers, holidaymakers, Filipino expatriates, and foreign tourists from as far away as North America, South America, and Europe.

Attractions

 
 Municipal hall – built in 1916.
 Santa Rosa de Lima parish church – inaugurated on 10 April 1858 and finished in 1886. Its façade is still intact with its original 
 Town plaza – site of a battle between the so-called Daanbantayan Volunteers and 19 well-armed bandits led by Capitan Berinoin 1898.
 San Pedro River - its northern bank has an abandoned Muslim settlement founded by Datu Daya during the pre-Spanish era.
 Tapilon point (also known as Punta Sampero) – site of the watchtower of Kandaya, called "daang bantayanan". But there are no remains of the watchtower.
 Malapascua Island – is situated across a shallow strait from the northernmost tip of Cebu. This small island is known for its wide white sand beach, Bounty Beach; it has also become known as a superior diving destination.
The  island is home to nesting seabirds, a colony of flying foxes, soft coral canyons, and rare and unusual nudibranchs.
 Monad Shoal – a  seamount known for its thresher sharks, making the shoal popular for recreational divers.

References

External links

 [ Philippine Standard Geographic Code]

Municipalities of Cebu